This is an incomplete list of Statutory Instruments of the United Kingdom in 1961. This listing includes the complete, 58 items, "Partial Dataset" as listed on www.legislation.gov.uk (as at March 2014).

Statutory Instruments

1-499
The Sovereign Base Areas of Akrotiri and Dhekelia (Appeals to Privy Council) Order in Council, 1961 SI 1961/59
The National Insurance (Non-participation-Benefits and Schemes) Amendment Regulations, 1961 SI 1961/137
The Evidence by Certificate Rules 1961 SI 1961/248 (L. 3)
The National Insurance (Modification of the Royal Naval Pension Scheme) Regulations, 1961 SI 1961/294
The National Insurance (Modification of Electricity Superannuation Schemes) Regulations, 1961 SI 1961/306
The National Insurance (Modification of Gas Superannuation Schemes) Regulations, 1961 SI 1961/307
The Superannuation (English Local Government and Jersey) Interchange Rules, 1961 SI 1961/316
The Anglo-Norwegian Sea Fisheries Order 1961 SI 1961/342
The Airways Corporations (General Staff, Pilots and Officers Pensions) (Amendment) Regulations, 1961 SI 1961/445

500-999
The National Insurance (Graduated Retirement Benefit and Consequential Provisions) Regulations, 1961 SI 1961/557
The National Insurance (Modification of Transport Undertaking Superannuation Funds) Regulation, 1961 SI 1961/559
The Double Taxation Relief (Taxes on Income) (Faroe Islands) Order 1961 SI 1961/579
The Visiting Forces and Allied Headquarters (Income Tax and Death Duties) (Designation) Order 1961 SI 1961/580
The Visiting Forces and Allied Headquarters (Stamp Duties) (Designation) Order, 1961 SI 1961/581
The National Insurance and Industrial Injuries (Turkey) Order, 1961 SI 1961/584
The Foreign Compensation (Czechoslovakia) (Registration) (Amendment) Order, 1961 SI 1961/585
The Industrial Assurance (Premium Receipt Books) (Amendment) Regulations, 1961 SI 1961/597
The Gambia (Appeals to Privy Council) Order in Council, 1961 SI 1961/744
The Trunk Roads (Ormskirk and Aughton) (40 m.p.h. Speed Limit) Order 1961 S.I. 1961/896
The National Insurance (Modification of Trustee Savings Banks Pensions) Regulations, 1961 SI 1961/910

1000-1499
The Charities (Exception of Certain Charities for Boy Scouts and Girl Guides from Registration) Regulations, 1961 SI 1961/1044
The National Insurance (Modification of Superannuation Provisions) (Assistant Clerks of Assize) Regulations, 1961 SI 1961/1083
The Family Allowances, National Insurance and Industrial Injuries (Germany) Order, 1959/ SI 1961/1202
The Nurses Agencies Regulations, 1961 SI 1961/1214
The Breathing Apparatus, Etc. (Report on Examination) Order, 1961 SI 1961/1345
The Superannuation (National Assistance Board) Transfer (Amendment) Rules, 1961 SI 1961/1376
The National Insurance (Non-participation-Assurance of Equivalent Pension Benefits) Amendment Regulations, 1961 SI 1961/1378
The Trunk Roads (40 m.p.h. Speed Limit Direction) (No.14) Order 1961 S.I. 1961/1384
The Overseas Service Superannuation Order, 1961 SI 1961/1494

1500-1999
The Merchant Shipping (Confirmation of Legislation) (Federation of Rhodesia and Nyasaland) Order, 1961 SI 1961/1509
The Visiting Forces (Designation) Order, 1961 SI 1961/1511
The National Insurance (Germany) Order, 1961 SI 1961/1513
The Merchant Shipping (Registration of Ships) (Highlands and Islands Shipping Services) Order, 1961 SI 1961/1514
The Temporary Importation (Commercial Vehicles and Aircraft) Regulations 1961 SI 1961/1523
The Construction (Lifting Operations) Regulations, 1961 SI 1961/1581
The Trunk Roads (Clayton-le-Woods and Whittle-le-Woods) (40 m.p.h. Speed Limit) Order 1961 S.I. 1961/1664
The Criminal Justice Act, 1961 (Commencement No.1) Order, 1961 SI 1961/1672
The Superannuation (Imperial Forestry Institute and Civil Service) Transfer Rules, 1961 SI 1961/1775
The Superannuation (Low Temperature Research Station and Civil Service) Transfer Rules, 1961 SI 1961/1776
The Superannuation (Pest Infestation Laboratory and Civil Service) Transfer Rules, 1961 SI 1961/1777
The Foreign Compensation (Roumania) Order, 1961 SI 1961/1832
The Family Allowances, National Insurance and Industrial Injuries (European Interim Agreement) Amendment Order, 1961 SI 1961/1833
The National Insurance (European Interim Agreement) Amendment Order, 1961 SI 1961/1834

2000-2469
The Distribution of German Enemy Property (No.4) Order, 1961 SI 1961/2030
The Admiralty Jurisdiction (Virgin Islands) Order in Council, 1961 SI 1961/2033
The Evidence (Bahamas) Order 1961 SI 1961/2041
The Evidence (Bermuda) Order 1961 SI 1961/2042
The Evidence (British Guiana) Order 1961 SI 1961/2043
The Evidence (British Honduras) Order 1961 SI 1961/2044
The Evidence (Dominica) Order 1961 SI 1961/2045
The Evidence (Fiji) Order 1961 SI 1961/2046
The Evidence (Gibraltar) Order 1961 SI 1961/2047
The Evidence (Mauritius) Order 1961 SI 1961/2048
The Evidence (St. Helena) Order 1961 SI 1961/2049
The Evidence (Sarawak) Order 1961 SI 1961/2050
The Evidence (Tanganyika) Order 1961 SI 1961/2051
The Evidence (Uganda) Order 1961 SI 1961/2052
The Evidence (Zanzibar) Order 1961 SI 1961/2053
The National Insurance (Non-participation-Certificates) Amendment Regulations, 1961 SI 1961/2176
The Whaling Industry (Ship) (Amendment) Regulations, 1961 SI 1961/2336
Board of Inquiry (Army) (Amendment) Rules, 1961 SI 1961/2469

Unreferenced Listings
The following 11 items were previously listed on this article, however are unreferenced on the authorities site, included here for a "no loss" approach.
Sheffield Water Order 1961 SI 1961/231
Food (Meat Inspection) (Scotland) Regulations 1961 SI 1961/243
Shipbuilding (Air Receivers) Order 1961 SI 1961/430
Act of Sederunt (Legal Aid Rules) (Amendment) 1961 SI 1961/1549
Construction (General Provisions) Regulations 1961 SI 1961/1580
Hopton Mine (Locomotives and Diesel Vehicles) Special Regulations 1961 SI 1961/1583
Cocklakes Mine (Locomotives and Diesel Vehicles) Special Regulations 1961 SI 1961/1769
Long Meg Mine (Locomotives and Diesel Vehicles) Special Regulations 1961 SI 1961/1774
Barnsley Water Order 1961 SI 1961/1877
Barnsley Water (Cranberry Holes) Order 1961 SI 1961/2057
Cambridge Waterworks Order 1961 SI 1961/2192

References

External links
Legislation.gov.uk delivered by the UK National Archive
UK SI's on legislation.gov.uk
UK Draft SI's on legislation.gov.uk

See also
List of Statutory Instruments of the United Kingdom

Lists of Statutory Instruments of the United Kingdom
Statutory Instruments